Jurema Ferraz (born 14 February 1985)  is an Angolan model and beauty pageant titleholder who was crowned Miss Angola 2010 and represented her country in the 2010 Miss Universe pageant.

Miss Angola

Miss Universe 2010
As the official representative of her country to the 2010 Miss Universe pageant broadcast live from Las Vegas, Nevada on 23 August, Ferraz participated as one of the 83 delegates who vied for the crown of eventual winner, Ximena Navarrete of Mexico.

References

External links
Official Miss Angola website

People from Namibe Province
1985 births
Living people
Angolan female models
Miss Universe 2010 contestants
Miss Angola winners